The Seattle Center Armory is a building in Seattle Center, in the U.S. state of Washington.

The building has housed the Center House Theater, The Center High School, and the Seattle Children's Museum.

History 
The Washington National Guard building the Seattle Field Artillery Armory in 1939, to be used by the 146th Field Artillery, the 66th Field Artillery Brigade, and the Washington Headquarters of the 41st Division of the National Guard.

The building became known as the Food Circus, and later Seattle Center House. It was remodeled in 2012.

The building houses a food court which has included restaurants such as Bean Sprouts Cafe and Cooking School, Bigfood BBQ, Cool Guys Fry Bar, Eltana, MOD Pizza, Skillet, and Subway.

References

External links 

 Seattle Center Armory at Seattle Center

Buildings and structures in Seattle
Seattle Center